Waima is a suburb of West Auckland, New Zealand. It is under the local governance of the Auckland Council. The majority of the modest population is clustered around the comparatively prominent Waima superette, situated just off the main arterial road Woodlands Park Road, on such streets as Waima Crescent, Hollywood Avenue, Boylan Road and Rimutaka Place. The central "hub" could be considered Waima reserve, which consists of various public amenities such as a playground, basketball court, toilets and a sport field.

To the northwest, Waima is bordered by popular walking track and Lower Nihotipu Reservoir pipeline route "Exhibition Drive". Two water treatment stations and holding tanks service Auckland city's water supply from locations on Woodlands Park Road. Waima extends East to Tainui Road and the Auckland Centennial Memorial Park and the cul de sac of Rimutaka place represents Waima's Southernmost point.

History

In the early 20th century, the area was a part of McEldowney fruit farm, owned by an Irish immigrant family.

Demographics

Waima-Woodlands Park had a population of 2,682 at the 2018 New Zealand census, an increase of 156 people (6.2%) since the 2013 census, and an increase of 219 people (8.9%) since the 2006 census. There were 882 households, comprising 1,308 males and 1,374 females, giving a sex ratio of 0.95 males per female. The median age was 38.9 years (compared with 37.4 years nationally), with 666 people (24.8%) aged under 15 years, 390 (14.5%) aged 15 to 29, 1,410 (52.6%) aged 30 to 64, and 213 (7.9%) aged 65 or older.

Ethnicities were 90.2% European/Pākehā, 7.7% Māori, 2.7% Pacific peoples, 9.1% Asian, and 2.6% other ethnicities. People may identify with more than one ethnicity.

The percentage of people born overseas was 30.2, compared with 27.1% nationally.

Although some people chose not to answer the census's question about religious affiliation, 65.3% had no religion, 21.7% were Christian, 0.2% had Māori religious beliefs, 0.6% were Hindu, 0.4% were Muslim, 0.9% were Buddhist and 2.6% had other religions.

Of those at least 15 years old, 750 (37.2%) people had a bachelor's or higher degree, and 186 (9.2%) people had no formal qualifications. The median income was $50,300, compared with $31,800 nationally. 693 people (34.4%) earned over $70,000 compared to 17.2% nationally. The employment status of those at least 15 was that 1,194 (59.2%) people were employed full-time, 324 (16.1%) were part-time, and 42 (2.1%) were unemployed.

Education
Most young residents attend nearby Woodlands Park Primary School or Titirangi Primary School and Glen Eden Intermediate school. The local State secondary schools are Green Bay High School, Kelston Boys High School and Kelston Girls High School. Catholic students usually commute by bus, or train from Glen Eden or New Lynn to Marist College (girls) or St Peter's College (boys).

References

External links
Photographs of Waima held in Auckland Libraries' heritage collections.

Suburbs of Auckland
Waitākere Ranges Local Board Area
Waitākere Ranges
West Auckland, New Zealand